Brewer's Dictionary of Irish Phrase and Fable was created by Jo O'Donoghue and Sean McMahon for the Brewer's Dictionary of Phrase and Fable series of books. It contains over five thousand entries regarding various subjects about Ireland and its sayings, myths, legends and fables.

See also
Brewer's Dictionary of Phrase and Fable
Brewer's Rogues, Villains and Eccentrics

Irish non-fiction books
Irish mythology
English dictionaries